Waleran II of Luxembourg, Lord of Ligny (died 1354), was a French nobleman and member of the House of Luxembourg.  He was Lord of Beauvoir, Roussy and Ligny.  He was a son of Waleran I and his wife, Joan of Beauvoir.

Walram initially inherited the castles of Beauvoir and Roussy from his mother.  After the death of his brother Henry II in 1303, he also inherited his father's Lordship of Ligny.

He died in 1354 and was buried in the church of Notre-Dame in Cambrai.

He was married to Guyotte (died 1338), the heiress of the Burgraviate of Lille.  Together they had a son:
 John I (died 1364).

External links 
 Page at genealogie-mittelalter.de

House of Luxembourg
13th-century births
1354 deaths
Lords of France
14th-century French people